Silver Series: Movie Theme Songs is the 9th compilation album by Filipino pop singer-actress Regine Velasquez-Alcasid released on August 8, 2006 and second among the Silver Series compilations. It was awarded by Philippine Association of the Record Industry as Platinum Status in the year 2008, denoting the shipments of 30,000+.

Background
This album is a part of Velasquez's former label Viva Records 25th Silver Anniversary celebration, which they released their Silver Series project. The project is a compilation album of their past artists including Velasquez. This compilation consists of movie theme songs from Velasquez's own movies and the other movies that Velasquez only performed for a theme. Only Velasquez and Sharon Cuneta had released a silver series in 3 categories, Silver Series: Greatest Hits, Movie Theme Songs and Duets.

Track listing

Release history

References

Regine Velasquez albums
2006 greatest hits albums